Elisabet Vladimirova Paisieva (born 17 December 1986), known as Elizabeth Paisieva, is a Bulgarian rhythmic gymnast.

Career 

Elizabeth was part of the Bulgarian Team that won the bronze team medal at the 2001 World Championships in Madrid. She won a bronze medal in the ribbon final at the 2003 World Championships. She has competed in 2 Olympics cycle. At the 2004 Summer Olympics she finished 12th overall in the rhythmic individual all-around competition, at the 2008 Summer Olympics, she placed 19th in qualifications.

References

External links
 
 Elizabeth Paisieva at Magical Action
 
 

1986 births
Living people
Olympic gymnasts of Bulgaria
Bulgarian rhythmic gymnasts
Gymnasts at the 2004 Summer Olympics
Gymnasts at the 2008 Summer Olympics
Medalists at the Rhythmic Gymnastics World Championships
Medalists at the Rhythmic Gymnastics European Championships
21st-century Bulgarian women